Ernest Albert Corey, MM & Three Bars (20 December 1891 – 25 August 1972) was a distinguished Australian soldier who served as a stretcher bearer during the First World War. He enlisted in the Australian Imperial Force on 13 January 1916, and was allocated to the 55th Battalion, where he was initially posted to a grenade section before volunteering for stretcher bearing duties. In 1917 he was twice awarded the Military Medal for his devotion to duty in aiding wounded soldiers, and twice again in 1918; becoming the only person to be awarded the Military Medal four times.

Born in New South Wales, Corey was employed as a blacksmith's striker upon leaving school. In January 1916, he became a member of the "Men from Snowy River" recruiting march, enlisting in Goulburn. Returning to Australia after the Armistice, he was discharged on medical grounds in 1919 and was employed in a number of jobs before re-enlisting in a militia battalion for service in the Second World War. He died in 1972 and was buried with full military honours in the Ex-Servicemen's section of Woden Cemetery, Australian Capital Territory.

Early life
Corey was born on 20 December 1891 in Numeralla, New South Wales, the eighth child of Thomas Corey and his wife Ellen, née Burke. He was educated at Thubergal Lake Public School, before leaving to become a blacksmith's striker at Martin's Smithy in Cooma. In January 1916, Corey marched from Cooma to Goulburn as a member of the "Men from Snowy River" recruiting march, and enlisted on 13 January. Along with the majority of other members of the march, he was allotted to the 55th Battalion.

First World War
Following training at Goulburn camp, he embarked for overseas on 4 September aboard HMAT Port Sydney with the 4th Reinforcements for the 55th Battalion. Arriving in England, he spent three months with the 14th Training Battalion at Hurdcott Camp near Fovant in Wiltshire, before joining the 55th Battalion on 8 February 1917 at Montauban, France. Posted to the grenade section of "C" Company, he took part in the capture of Doignies in April.

On 15 May, Corey's brigade was in action near Quéant. Suffering heavy losses, the Commanding Officer of the 55th called for volunteers to assist the stretcher bearers; Corey was one of thirty men who volunteered. For seventeen hours, he assisted in carrying the wounded approximately  back to the dressing station; he was awarded the Military Medal for this action.

Following engagements at Bullecourt, the 5th Division—of which the 55th Battalion was part—spent four months in reserve, before moving into the Ypres sector in Belgium. Made a regular stretcher bearer, Corey was decorated with a bar to his Military Medal for his actions on 26 September during the Battle of Polygon Wood. While subject to heavy artillery and machine gun fire, he frequently ventured out into no-man's-land to tend to the wounded.

During the winter of 1917–1918, the 55th Battalion was posted to the Messines sector, where Corey was granted leave to the United Kingdom in February 1918. While on leave, he became ill and spent ninety days in hospital before rejoining his battalion in July. Shortly after, the Allies launched an offensive against the Germans in August along the Somme, where the 55th Battalion became involved in the capture of Péronne in September. It was here where Corey received the second bar to his Military Medal; between 1–2 September, while subject to heavy machine gun and artillery fire, he continually assisted the wounded with first aid.

Promoted to corporal on 21 September, he was placed in charge of the battalion's stretcher bearers, whom he led during the battle north of Bellicourt on 30 September. Corey attended to the wounded while exposed to fire, and continued to direct other bearer parties throughout the action until wounded himself, receiving wounds in the right groin and thigh. It was during this engagement that he was awarded a third bar to his Military Medal. He is the only person to have been awarded the Military Medal four times. Evacuated to a casualty station, Corey was operated on before receiving a transfer to a general hospital at Le Havre. Operated on again, he was sent to a hospital in Bristol, England. Repatriated to Australia on 30 April 1919, he was medically discharged in June.

Later life
Returning to Cooma, Corey was employed as a contract rabbiter before moving to Canberra in 1922, where he was employed as a camp caretaker. On 23 September 1924, at St Gregory's Catholic Church, Queanbeyan, he married Sarah Jane Fisher; the pair later had a daughter, Patricia, before the marriage was dissolved in 1935. Between 1927 and 1940, Corey worked for the Department of the Interior as an office cleaner. He re-enlisted for service in the Second World War with the Australian Military Forces on 23 September 1941, and was posted to the 2nd Garrison Battalion for two years before he was medically discharged as a private on 11 October 1943.

He then went through a series of jobs, including employment as a caretaker, a cook for a departmental survey party and as a leading hand at the Canberra incinerator. By 1951 he was almost crippled with osteoarthritis, and soon after was admitted to the Queanbeyan Private Nursing Home, where he died on 25 August 1972; he was buried with full military honours in the Ex-Servicemen's section of Woden Cemetery.

His medals are displayed in the First World War gallery at the Australian War Memorial, and replicas of his medals and copies of the citations for the Military Medal and three bars can be viewed in the Canberra Services Club, of which he was a member for many years.

Citations

Memorial
Following several donations by the people of Cooma and the Monaro District, a Memorial Plaque to Corey was erected in Centennial Park, Cooma in 1979. In 1995, the plaque was moved to the Cooma Memorial and the committee involved with the relocation decided to erect a diorama based on a painting in the Australian War Memorial depicting stretcher bearers bringing in wounded soldiers under heavy shell fire at Mont St Quentin during the First World War. A local artist and sculptor, Chris Graham, was commissioned to undertake the project which was constructed from steel and concrete. It was erected in the Cooma War Memorial area on 23 April 1996.

The inscription on the memorial reads:

References

1892 births
1972 deaths
Australian Army soldiers
Australian military personnel of World War I
Australian Army personnel of World War II
People from New South Wales
Australian recipients of the Military Medal